Relictocera is a genus of spiders from Southeast Asia in the family Psilodercidae, first described in 2017.

Species 
 it contains five species:

 Relictocera mus (Deeleman-Reinhold, 1995) – Thailand
 Relictocera qianzi F. Y. Li & S. Q. Li, 2019 – Thailand
 Relictocera qiyi F. Y. Li & S. Q. Li, 2017 – Vietnam
 Relictocera sigen F. Y. Li & S. Q. Li, 2019 – Vietnam
 Relictocera wugen F. Y. Li & S. Q. Li, 2019 – Vietnam

References

External links

Psilodercidae